Hans Peter Christian Denver (28 October 1876 – 18 September 1961) was a Danish sport shooter who competed in the 1912 Summer Olympics.

He was born in Osted, Lejre, and died in Copenhagen.

In 1912, Denver was a member of the Danish team which finished fifth in the 50 metre team small-bore rifle competition. He also participated in the 300 metre free rifle, three positions event but did not finished the contest.

References

1876 births
1961 deaths
Danish male sport shooters
ISSF rifle shooters
Olympic shooters of Denmark
Shooters at the 1912 Summer Olympics
People from Lejre Municipality
Sportspeople from Region Zealand